Diphenylphosphite is a diorganophosphite with the formula (C6H5O)2P(O)H. The molecule is tetrahedral. It is a colorless viscous liquid. The compounds can be prepared by treating phosphorus trichloride with phenol. Many analogues can be prepared similarly. One illustrative reaction, diphenylphosphite, aldehydes, and amines react to afford aminophosphonates (Kabachnik–Fields reaction).

See also
Dimethylphosphite
Diethylphosphite
Diisopropylphosphite

References

Organophosphites